Mr. Morgan's Last Love (also known as Last Love) is a 2013 film based on Françoise Dorner's French novel La Douceur Assassine. It is written and directed by Sandra Nettelbeck and stars Michael Caine and Clémence Poésy.

Synopsis

The film centres around a retired, widowed professor (Caine) living in Paris who develops a special relationship with a young French woman (Poésy). That's the central structure for a sensitive story about changing relationships for this professor and his son, and life's meaning.

Cast
 Michael Caine as Matthew Morgan
 Clémence Poésy as Pauline Laubie
 Justin Kirk as Miles Morgan
 Jane Alexander as Joan Morgan
 Gillian Anderson as Karen Morgan
 Richard Hope as Philatelist
 Anne Alvaro as Colette Léry
 Louis-Julien Petit as Sleeping Student on Bus

Production
The film was shot in Paris, Brittany, Brussels and Cologne in August 2011.

The book's French protagonist Monsieur Armand was changed to American Mr. Morgan. Nettelbeck wrote the screenplay with Caine in mind.

Reception
Mr. Morgan's Last Love received mixed reviews. On Rotten Tomatoes, the film holds a 31% rating, based on 39 reviews, with an average score of 4.67/10. The website's critics consensus reads: "Last Love benefits from a typically strong Michael Caine performance, but it's ultimately too mawkish and dawdling to make much impact." Metacritic gives the film a score of 36 out of 100, sampled from thirteen reviews.

References

External links
 
 
 

2013 films
2013 comedy-drama films
German comedy-drama films
Belgian comedy-drama films
American comedy-drama films
French comedy-drama films
2010s English-language films
English-language German films
English-language Belgian films
English-language French films
2010s French-language films
Films based on French novels
Films shot in Brussels
Films shot in Cologne
Films shot in France
Films shot in Paris
Films scored by Hans Zimmer
Films about old age
2010s American films
2010s French films
2010s German films